Brandon Ess (born 11 July 1971) is a German cricketer. He was named in Germany's squad for the 2017 ICC World Cricket League Division Five tournament in South Africa. He played in Germany's opening fixture, against Ghana, on 3 September 2017.

References

External links
 

1971 births
Living people
German cricketers
Place of birth missing (living people)